"We're in This Together" is a song by British soul and pop band Simply Red. It was released as the fourth and last single from their album, Life. The song was chosen as the official song for UEFA Euro 1996 held in England. Simply Red performed at the opening and closing ceremony. It reached number 8 in the Czech Republic, number 11 in the UK and number 13 in Scotland. On the Eurochart Hot 100, the single peaked at number 39. A music video was also made to accompany it.

Critical reception
William Ruhlmann from AllMusic declared "We're in This Together" as a "big-time closer" and a "South African-style anthem, complete with Hugh Masekela's flugelhorn." Caroline Sullivan from The Guardian described it as "hymnlike" and "lighters-aloft". Connie Johnson from Los Angeles Times complimented its "solemn lushness". Alan Jones from Music Week wrote, "A rather stark and ponderous thing it is, too, although the percussively enhanced Universal Feeling mix is livelier. Its saving grâce is probably that a sublime sax solo is followed by a swelling chorus which finally summons up the stirring qualities it would have been nice to have had from the start." Pop Rescue noted that it "builds up and up with brass, choir, and motivational lyrics", stating that it "aims for epic, and earns its goal." Mary DeCicco from The Record said that it has "messages of hope and affirmation". David Gaskey from The Rice Thresher described it as "soulful", adding that the song "uses the talents of the Umoja Singers Chorale to emphasize the theme of world unity."

Track listing

Charts

References

1996 singles
UEFA European Championship official songs and anthems
UEFA Euro 1996
1996 songs
Simply Red songs
Song articles with missing songwriters